Philaenarcys is a genus of spittlebugs in the family Aphrophoridae. There are at least three described species in Philaenarcys.

Species
These three species belong to the genus Philaenarcys:
 Philaenarcys bilineata (Say, 1831) (prairie spittlebug)
 Philaenarcys killa Hamilton, 1979
 Philaenarcys spartina Hamilton, 1979

References

Articles created by Qbugbot
Aphrophoridae
Auchenorrhyncha genera